El Algarrobo is an iron mine in north-central Chile. Geologically it is an iron oxide-apatite (IOA) type of deposit. El Algarrobo is part of a wider province of iron ores known as the Chilean Iron Belt. From the 1970s onward El Romeral have come to overshadow El Algarrobo in iron ore production.

References

Bibliography 

Iron ore mines in Chile
Mines in Atacama Region
Surface mines in Chile